Angkor Thom is an administrative district of Siem Reap province, in north western Cambodia. According to the 1998 census of Cambodia, it had a population of 17,750.

The archaeological site of Angkor Thom is not located in this district, but in Siem Reap Municipality (Sangkat of Kouk Chak and Nokor Thum).

Administrative divisions 
Angkor Thom District a district in Siem Reap. The district has 4 communes and ? villages.

References

Districts of Cambodia
Geography of Siem Reap province